Hacıhasan can refer to:

 Hacıhasan, Alaplı
 Hacıhasan, Gölbaşı
 Hacıhasan, Ilgaz
 Hacıhasan, Karataş